Thomas Ewing (born 2 May 1937) is a Scottish former professional footballer. He represented the Scottish Football League XI and was capped twice by Scotland.

Ewing, a left-winger, played for Birkenshaw Welfare Hearts and Larkhall Thistle before joining Partick Thistle. He won both of his Scotland caps while with Partick, against England and Wales in 1958.

He joined Aston Villa in February 1962, making 39 league appearances before returning to Partick Thistle. He subsequently played for Morton and Hamilton Academical. He also managed Hamilton from November 1969 to 1970.

References

External links

1937 births
Living people
Scottish footballers
Scotland international footballers
Partick Thistle F.C. players
Aston Villa F.C. players
Greenock Morton F.C. players
Hamilton Academical F.C. players
Scottish football managers
Hamilton Academical F.C. managers
Larkhall Thistle F.C. players
Scottish Football League players
English Football League players
Association football wingers
Scottish Football League representative players
Scottish Football League managers
Sportspeople from Larkhall
Footballers from South Lanarkshire
Scottish Junior Football Association players